Piss is an outdoor 2004 sculpture and fountain by Czech artist David Černý, installed outside the Franz Kafka Museum in Malá Strana, Prague, Czech Republic.

Description
The fountain's basin is made of bronze and shaped like the Czech Republic. Visitors to the area can command the men to write messages into the water via SMS.

Reception
The Prague Post ranked Piss number one in their article, "Top 10 strangest statues in Prague", in which Ada von Kayser described the work as "both controversial and amusing".

See also
 Kinetic art
 List of depictions of urine in art

References

External links

 

2004 establishments in the Czech Republic
2004 sculptures
Bronze sculptures in the Czech Republic
Fountains in the Czech Republic
Kinetic sculptures in the Czech Republic
Malá Strana
Outdoor sculptures in Prague
Sculptures of men in Prague
Statues in Prague
Works by Czech people